Haines Falls is a hamlet (and census-designated place) located east of Tannersville in the Town of Hunter, in Greene County, New York, United States. The hamlet of Haines Falls was always a mountain resort town, unlike Hunter and Palenville which had tanneries. Haines Falls is at the head of Kaaterskill Clove and is the former site of the Catskill Mountain House, Kaaterskill Hotel, and Laurel House which sat atop the famous Kaaterskill Falls. In 1825, Thomas Cole, founder of the Hudson River School of landscape painters, did his first Catskill mountain paintings in Haines Falls: Lake with Dead Trees at South Lake and the Kaaterskill Falls.

Major highways in Haines Falls include State Route 23A, Clum Hill Road, North Lake Road, and County Route 25. Horseshoe Bend is the location of many vehicle accidents and hikers who tumble off the falls. The town elevation ranges from 1500' to 2200' above sea level making it the highest unincorporated town in New York state.

References

External links

High Peaks Hiking in Hunter Area Catskill 3500 Club
Town of Hunter Government Website and Area Information
Town of Hunter Chamber of Commerce
Online Guide to the Catskill Mountains
The Catskill Archive - history of the Catskill Mtns.
Hunter Public Library
Mountain Top Library
Mountain Top Historical Society

Hamlets in New York (state)
Catskills
Hamlets in Greene County, New York